Salina High School South is a public school located in Salina, Kansas, serving students in grades 9-12. It is operated by Salina USD 305 school district, and students who live south of Cloud Avenue attend this school.  It serves approximately 1,057 students each year, and about 90% of the staff employed at the school are certified, including principal Curtis Stevens. The school colors are green, gold, and white. The school mascot is the Cougar. The athletic teams offered at Salina South are varied and compete in the 5A division according to the KSHSAA.

History

Salina South High School was established in 1971 due to overcrowding at Salina Central High School. The school was selected as a Blue Ribbon School in 1984. The Blue Ribbon Award recognizes public and private schools which perform at high levels or have made significant academic improvements. The school has additionally been through multiple renovations, with the most recent being in 2016–18.

School layout
Salina South was formerly a brown building distinctly recognized by its three "pods" (circular hallways named the 200, 300, and 400 Pods). The "pod" design featured doorless classrooms with faux walls and very few windows. In April 2014, a $110 million bond was approved which would fund a whole new school, due to the "pods" being in poor condition. The new building was built in 3 phases from 2016 to 2018 as part of a district wide remodeling of schools. The new building contains many windows, increased security, larger classrooms, a school store, a coffee bar, and a more modern design from the old "pod" design.

Extracurricular activities

Athletics

Football
In 2000,  the football team won the 5A state championship with a victory over Pittsburg High School. The football team repeated as state champions in 2004 with a victory over Olathe North High School.

State championships

Fall
 Football
 Cross Country
 Girls Tennis
 Volleyball
 Cheerleading
 Marching Band
 Girls Golf
 Boys Soccer

Winter
 Basketball
 Wrestling
 Boys Swimming
 Bowling

Spring
 Girls Soccer
 Baseball
 Boys Golf
 Boys Tennis
 Softball
 Track and Field
 Girls Swimming

Non-athletic programs
2006 - The debate team qualified a Policy Debate Team for the National Forensics League National Tournament for the first time since 1995. This same team, composed of Bret Higgins and Josh Harzman won the 5A 2-Speaker Debate State Tournament. The same year Bret Higgins won the 5A Lincoln-Douglas Debate State Championship.
2007 - The Salina South Theatre department's production of Guys and Dolls received national recognition from USA Weekend's High School Musical Showstopper as one of the top high school productions in America.
1984-2005 - The school marching band, the Salina South Marching Cougars, received 21 straight "Superior" ratings for their field performances at the annual Central States Marching Festival held at Kansas State University in Manhattan, Kansas under the leadership of director Randall Fillmore.

Notable alumni
 Adrianna Franch, class of 2009, professional soccer player for Portland Thorns FC
 Brent Venables, head football coach at the University of Oklahoma
Anne Boyer (class of 1991), poet and essayist
Mark Stucky (class of 1976), test pilot, astronaut.

See also
 Salina High School Central
 Southeast of Saline
 List of high schools in Kansas
 List of unified school districts in Kansas

References

External links
 School Website
 District Website

Public high schools in Kansas
Education in Salina, Kansas
1971 establishments in Kansas